La Petite Rivière is a tributary stream of the Nelson River, flowing in the administrative region of Capitale-Nationale, in the province from Quebec, to Canada. The course of the river crosses:
 Quebec City over only a hundred metres;
 the municipality of Lac-Saint-Charles over only a hundred metres;
 the municipality of Saint-Gabriel-de-Valcartier in the La Jacques-Cartier Regional County Municipality.

This watercourse is part of the watershed of the Saint-Charles River.

The valley of "La Petite Rivière" is mainly served by boulevard Valcartier and rue Morley.

The surface of "La Petite Rivière" (except the rapids areas) is generally frozen from the beginning of December to the end of March; however, safe circulation on the ice is generally done from the end of December to the beginning of March. The water level of the river varies with the seasons and the precipitation; the spring flood occurs in March or April.

Geography 
Land use in the La Petite Rivière sub-basin is mainly forested on the northeast side and agricultural in the southwest side. Located on the north side of boulevard Valcartier, Lac Rifey is the head lake of this small river. It is located between Mont Brillant (south side) and Mont Snow (North side). A quarrying zone that runs along boulevard Valcartier is located on the west side of this head lake.

  towards the north-west following the foot of the cliff of Mont Snow, up to the discharge (coming from the North-East) of three small unidentified lakes;
  south-west, to its mouth.

From the mouth of La Petite Rivière, the current descends on  following the course of the Nelson river; then on  generally towards the south-east, then towards the north-east, following the course of the Saint-Charles river.

Naming 
The name "La Petite Rivière" was formalized on January 7, 1985 at the Commission de toponymie du Québec. It is a toponym for the nearby features.

Sources 
Among the sources used for this article are:

 Vescovi, L. (1998) Modern thinking on urban water management: hydro-bio-chemical modeling of the Saint-Charles river basin. Quebec: INRS-Eau (Doctoral thesis) ; extract consulted via Rivière vivante, June 15, 2006.
 Brodeur, C., F. Lewis, E. Huet-Alegre, Y. Ksouri, M.-C. Leclerc and D. Viens. 2007. Portrait of the Saint-Charles river basin. Saint-Charles river basin council. 216 p + 9 annexes 217-340 pp.

Notes and references

See also 

 La Jacques-Cartier, a  MRC
 Quebec (city), a city
 Lac-Saint-Charles, a municipality
 Saint-Gabriel-de-Valcartier, a municipality
 La Haute-Saint-Charles, an area of Quebec City
 Saint-Charles River
 St. Lawrence River
 List of rivers of Quebec

La Petite Rivière